Khvoshalan (also Romanized as Khvoshālān; also known as Khvosh Owlān) is a village in Beradust Rural District, Sumay-ye Beradust District, Urmia County, West Azerbaijan Province, Iran. At the 2006 census, its population was 281, in 51 families.

References 

Populated places in Urmia County